"I Got You" is a song written and recorded by American country music artist Dwight Yoakam.  It was released in February 1989 as the third single from his album Buenas Noches from a Lonely Room.  It peaked at #5 in both the United States and Canada.

Chart performance

Year-end charts

References

Dwight Yoakam songs
1989 singles
Songs written by Dwight Yoakam
Reprise Records singles
1989 songs
Song recordings produced by Pete Anderson